The Animal and Plant Health Agency (APHA), formerly known as the Animal Health and Veterinary Laboratories Agency (AHVLA), is an executive agency of the Department for Environment, Food and Rural Affairs (Defra) of the United Kingdom.

It was formed in its current state on 1 October 2014, when AHVLA was expanded by adding parts of the Food and Environment Research Agency (FERA), including the Plant Health and Seeds Inspectorate (PHSI). AHVLA had originally been established on 1 April 2011 by a merger of two former agencies, Animal Health and the Veterinary Laboratories Agency.

The agency's main task is to protect the health and welfare of animals, as well as the general public, from disease. It conducts work across Great Britain on behalf of Defra, the Scottish Government and the Welsh Government.

The agency's total expenditure for the fiscal year 2016/17 was £217.3 million. This was offset by operating income of £62.6 million giving net expenditure of £154.7 million.

See also
 National Office of Animal Health

References

External links
 Official website

Agricultural organisations based in the United Kingdom
Department for Environment, Food and Rural Affairs
Executive agencies of the United Kingdom government
Food safety organizations
Veterinary medicine in the United Kingdom
Veterinary organizations
Regulators of the United Kingdom